The Light and Darkness War is a limited series, six-issue comic book written by Tom Veitch and illustrated by Cam Kennedy. 

Originally published by Epic Comics, an imprint of Marvel Comics, Titan Books released a collected hardcover edition of the series in May 2015. In addition to the six complete issues of the original comics, the book contains a foreword by retired United States Navy Commander and helicopter pilot Mike Beidler; a background briefing by Tom Veitch; an essay by Stephen R. Bissette; and extensive sketch and development art by Cam Kennedy.

Plot synopsis
Lazarus Jones, a disabled Vietnam War veteran who lost his legs in combat during a helicopter explosion that killed four of his brothers-in-arms, suffers post-traumatic stress disorder and descends into alcohol and drug abuse. Years later, living a life bordering on despair, he wishes he had died with his friends.

After an emotional visit to the Vietnam Veterans Memorial Wall with his wife Chris, he suffers a car accident that puts him in a coma, during which he is transported to another dimension where his friends are alive, serving as warriors in a never-ending battle against Lord Na and the forces of Outer Darkness.

References

The Light and Darkness War creators' website

1988 comics debuts
1989 comics endings
War comics published by Marvel Comics
Marvel Comics set during the Vietnam War